Kemp Plummer Battle (December 19, 1831 – February 4, 1919) was an American lawyer, railroad president, university president, educator, and historian. He served as North Carolina State Treasurer and as president of the University of North Carolina in the nineteenth century.

Early years
Battle spent his early childhood in Louisburg, North Carolina, where his father William Horn Battle practiced law and was active in politics. His grandfather was "the honest lawyer" Kemp Plummer.

University of North Carolina
He graduated from the University of North Carolina at Chapel Hill in 1849 as the valedictorian of his class. He was also a member of the Dialectic Society while attending UNC. During the next five years he worked at the university, as tutor of Latin and then as tutor of mathematics, while studying law under the tutelage of his father.

Law practice
He was admitted to the bar in 1854 and began a practice in Raleigh. In 1857, he was named a director of the rechartered Bank of North Carolina.

Civil War
In 1861 Battle was a delegate to the Secession Convention and signed the Ordinance of Secession. During the Civil War he served as president of the Chatham Railroad which existed primarily to haul coal from the mines in Chatham County to Confederate armament factories.

In 1862, Battle was elected by the legislature to serve as a trustee of the University and held this position until 1868, when the entire board was thrown out by the Reconstruction General Assembly. He was elected Treasurer by the legislature in 1866 but removed from office in 1868 by the occupying U.S. military authorities because of his service to the Confederacy.

University of North Carolina
In 1874, Battle was reappointed a trustee to the University.  He was named president of the University in 1876 and served ably until 1891, when he resigned to become Alumni Professor of History. He became a distinguished historian and compiled a significant body of scholarly work, the most prominent piece being his two-volume History of the University of North Carolina which is still today considered a significant study.  The Dialectic and Philanthropic Societies, the oldest student group on UNC's campus, used to hold a history lecture in Battle's name and honor every year on the eve of University Day. However, the Societies have renamed and rededicated this lecture because of Battle's actions and legacy, which are inconsistent with their own values. 
Battle is buried in Historic Oakwood Cemetery.

References

NC Treasurer Official site
Historic Oakwood Cemetery

External links
 

1831 births
1919 deaths
Burials at Historic Oakwood Cemetery
State treasurers of North Carolina
Leaders of the University of North Carolina at Chapel Hill
19th-century American politicians
People from Louisburg, North Carolina
University of North Carolina at Chapel Hill alumni
University of North Carolina School of Law faculty